Nyköpings gymnasium Gripen or more commonly referred as "Gripenskolan" is a gymnasium located in Nyköping, Sweden. The school will be the new center of gymnasium education in Nyköping when Nyköpings gymnasium Tessin is closed in 2014.  It is located in the neighborhood of Högbrunn.

Educational programs
 Construction
 Craftsmanship
 Science
 Technics

References

Gymnasiums (school) in Sweden